Year 1116 (MCXVI) was a leap year starting on Saturday (link will display the full calendar) of the Julian calendar.

Events 
 By place 

 Byzantine Empire 
 Autumn – Battle of Philomelion: Emperor Alexios I (Komnenos) leads an expedition into Anatolia and meets the Seljuk army under Sultan Malik Shah (near Philomelium). The Byzantines introduce a new battle formation of Alexios' devising, the parataxis (a defensive formation, consisting of a hollow square, with the baggage in the centre). During the battle, the Seljuk Turks mount several attacks on the formations, but all are repulsed. The Byzantine cavalry makes two counterattacks; the first is unsuccessful. But a second attack, led by Nikephoros Bryennios (the Younger), breaks the Seljuk forces, who then turn to flight. The following day Malik Shah again attacks, his army completely surrounding the Byzantines from all sides. The Seljuk Turks are once more repulsed, with many losses. Alexios claims the victory, and Malik Shah is forced to accept a peace treaty, in which he promises to respect the frontiers of the Byzantine Empire.Steven Runciman (1952). A History of The Crusades. Vol II: The Kingdom of Jerusalem, p. 112. .

 Levant 
 Summer – The Crusaders under King Baldwin I of Jerusalem undertake an expedition to Egypt and march as far as Akaba on the Red Sea. After the local inhabitants flee from the town, Baldwin constructs castles in Akaba and on a nearby island. He leaves a garrison in both fortresses. The three Crusader strongholds – Montréal, Eilat and Graye – secure the control of the caravan routes between Syria and Egypt.
 Autumn – Baldwin I hastens to Tyre (modern Lebanon) and begins the construction of a new fortress, known as Scandelion Castle, at the Ladder of Tyre, which completes the blockade of the town from the mainland.

 Europe 
 February 3 – King Coloman (the Learned) dies after a 21-year reign in which he has consolidated the feudal system in Hungary and expanded the frontier (partly by overthrowing King Peter II of Croatia).
 Ramon Berenguer III (the Great), count of Barcelona, sails to Rome in an effort to gain support from the Italian states and a licence from Pope Paschal II for his crusade against the Moors in Spain.
 July 15 – Ordelafo Faliero, doge of Venice, defeats the Hungarian troops under King Stephen II, who have arrived to relieve Zadar; the remaining towns of Dalmatia surrender to Venice.
 Portuguese forces under Countess Theresa take two Galician cities, Tui and Ourense. In reply, the sister of Theresa, Queen Urraca (the Reckless), attacks Portugal.
 Almoravid troops conquer the Balearic islands, whose Moorish rulers has been severely weakened by Pisan and Catalan raiders.

 England 
 The Welsh under King Gruffydd ap Rhys of Deheubarth attacks Llandovery Castle, but are defeated. Gruffydd also attacks Swansea Castle and destroys the outer walls.

 Africa 
 The Zirid ruler of Ifriqiya, Ali ibn Yahya, conquers the island of Jerba, then acting as an independent piratical republic. 

 By topic 

 Art and Music 
 Aak music is introduced to the Korean court, through a large gift of 428 musical instruments as well as 572 costumes and ritual dance objects from China, by Emperor Hui Zong of the Song Dynasty.

 Religion 
 Construction starts on the Chennakeshava Temple (located on the Yagachi River) commissioned by King Vishnuvardhana at Belur in India.
 The monastery at Peterborough in England is destroyed by fire.

Births 
 April 12 – Richeza of Poland, queen of Sweden (d. 1156)
 August 29 – Philip of France, king of France (d. 1131)
 November 23 – William FitzRobert, 2nd Earl of Gloucester (d. 1183)
 Berengaria of Barcelona, queen of León and Castile (d. 1149)
 Ibn al-Azraq al-Fariqi, Arab historian and writer (d. 1176)
 Ibn al-Jawzi, Arab historian and philologist (d. 1201)
 Ibn Mada', Arab scholar and polymath (d. 1196)
 Roger de Clare, 2nd Earl of Hertford (d. 1173)
 Ruaidrí Ua Conchobair, king of Connacht (d. 1198)

Deaths 
 February 3 – Coloman (the Learned), king of Hungary
 February 13 – Galon (or Gallo), bishop of Beauvais
 Abu Nasr Farsi, Persian statesman and poet (or 1117)
 Bagrat Pakrad, Armenian nobleman and adventurer
 Jimena Díaz, Spanish noblewoman (approximate date)
 Malik Shah, Seljuk ruler of the Sultanate of Rum
 Mary of Scotland, countess of Boulogne (b. 1082)
 Robert of Arbrissel, founder of Fontevrault Abbey

References